Glenlyon Norfolk School (GNS) is an independent, co-ed, university preparatory day school in Victoria and Oak Bay, British Columbia, Canada.  It was formed in 1986 with the amalgamation of Glenlyon School and Norfolk House.  The school offers instruction from Junior Kindergarten to Grade 12.  The school offers the International Baccalaureate at all three levels: the Primary Years Programme, Middle Years Programme and, at the high school level, offers the IB Diploma Programme. Of the 2,124 schools that participate in the IB programme in North America and the Caribbean, Glenlyon Norfolk School is one of only 25 schools to offer the programme at all three levels.

GNS is a member of the International Baccalaureate Organization, Round Square, the Canadian Accredited Independent Schools (CAIS), Independent Schools Association of British Columbia (ISABC), and National Association of Independent Schools (NAIS).

The current Head of School is Mr. Chad Holtum. 

GNS was ranked by the Fraser Institute in 2017/2018 as #9 out of 251 British Columbia Secondary Schools.

History
In 1913, a pair of enterprising British women founded Norfolk House School, an all-girls school on what is now the Pemberton Woods Campus. Miss Atkins and Miss McDermott were dedicated to a rigorous education in academics, arts, and values. 20 years later, Glenlyon Preparatory School for boys was established on the Beach Campus location by Major Ian Simpson.
In 1986, the schools joined together. In 2013, GNS celebrated its 100-year anniversary since the founding of Norfolk House.

GNS's nearly 700 students occupy two campuses: the Beach Drive Campus, and the Pemberton Woods Campus. The Beach Drive Campus is located near Willows Beach in Oak Bay and is home to students in Junior Kindergarten through to Grade Five. The campus is focused around the former home of Sir Francis Rattenbury. Until 2003, the Beach Drive Campus was known as the Junior Boys Campus, reserved for boys from Kindergarten to Grade 7, while girls in grades Kindergarten to Grade 12 attended classes on the Pemberton Woods Campus. In 2003 the school restructured its approach to co-ed learning, and for the first time, female students were allowed on the Beach Drive Campus. The Beach Drive Campus became a primary campus with Grades K to 5 in single-gender classes sharing a co-educational environment. The Pemberton Woods Campus became a Grades 6 to 12 campus with Grades 6 to 12 in co-ed classes. In 2012, the school became fully co-educational from Junior Kindergarten to Grade 12.

The Pemberton Woods Campus, home to students Grades 6 through to 12, combines the old Norfolk House Campus with a number of new buildings built after the amalgamation.

Each Campus has its own Principal (Ms. Crystal Shea in the Junior School, Mr. Russell Marston in the Middle School and Mr. Doug Palm in the Senior School), while the entire school is administered by the Head of School, Mr. Chad Holtum.

In 1996, the school was accepted as an International Baccalaureate World School and began offering the IB Diploma to students in Grades 11 and 12. This was followed by authorization to offer the IB Middle Years Programme in 2004 and the IB Primary Years Programme in 2007, making GNS one of a few schools in Canada to offer the full IB continuum.

In June 2007, the Board of Directors approved a plan for comprehensive campus transformation. In 2009, an artificial turf field was installed. In the spring of 2013 Denford Hall, seating over 350, was completed. The WONDER Campaign was launched in 2018 to refurbish the school's two campuses, at Beach Drive and Pemberton Woods, which was supported by a $5 million donation by Gordon Denford.

On Friday, May 24, 2019, the school celebrated the official opening of the school's new Junior Kindergarten and Kindergarten facilities and the re-dedication of the Boathouse, one of the buildings originally designed by Francis Rattenbury.

On September 9, 2020, the Main Building on the Junior School campus was opened.

In September 2021, GNS opened a 24-bed boarding house in the renovated Oak Bay Guest House on Newport Avenue, called Gryphon House. 

On December 14, 2021, the school celebrated the opening of the David Graham Learning Commons, a renovation of the Middle School Library.

Debate
GNS's Senior Campus is known for a successful debate program. The school occasionally sends debaters to the Worlds and regularly sends students to the Junior and Senior National debate tournaments and seminars.

Athletics
Glenlyon Norfolk identifies three girls sports and three boys sports as the ‘major’ sports of the School: Girls Field Hockey, Basketball, and Football; Boys Rugby, Basketball, and Football. In these 6 sports, the explicit goal is being competitive at the Provincial level.

Since 1986 (the year of amalgamation) the Gryphons have won Vancouver Island Championships and Independent School Championships 38 times in 14 different sports and
Provincial Championships as follows:
Boys Rugby (‘95) ('17), Tennis (’98, ’03), Climbing (’99), Girls Football (’03, ’05, '10, '11), Boys Football (’05,'07,'09,'10,'11,'12,'13, 14, 15), Boys Basketball (’07), Golf (’07, ’08).

Clubs
Clubs include: Tech Team, debate, photography, Round Square and the Pride and Equality Club.

Brother Schools
Setagaya Gakuen School - Tokyo Japan

Heads of school
1987–1997: David Brooks
1997–2001: Charles Peacock
2001–2004: Barbara Emmerson
2004–2015: Simon Bruce-Lockhart
2015–2020 : Dr Glenn Zederayko
2020– : Chad Holtum

Notable Graduates
Chris Wylie, Canadian data consultant and whistleblower associated with the Cambridge Analytica data scandal. He claims to have dropped out at age 16 spending grades 9-11 at GNS.

References

External links

Google Satellite Map of Pemberton Woods Campus
Google Satellite Map of Beach Drive Campus

Boarding schools in British Columbia
International Baccalaureate schools in British Columbia
Private schools in British Columbia
Round Square schools
Educational institutions established in 1913
1913 establishments in British Columbia